Mohawk Valley Health System (MVHS) is a non-profit health system providing services to residents of the Mohawk Valley in Central New York. It was created in 2014 as an affiliation of Faxton St. Luke's Healthcare and St. Elizabeth Medical Center. MVHS now operates three campuses with acute care beds and emergency services - Faxton Campus, St. Luke's Campus, and St. Elizabeth Campus.

MVHS is a designated Children's Miracle Network Hospital.

History
Faxton Hospital evolved from the union of two facilities: Children's Hospital and Rehabilitation Center, an outgrowth of the Utica Orphan Asylum on Genesee Street established in 1830, and Faxton Hospital, established by Theodore S. Faxton on Sunset Avenue in Utica in 1875. On January 1, 1989, Faxton Hospital and Children's Hospital merged to become Faxton Hospital.

St. Elizabeth's Hospital was founded in West Utica in 1866. Mother M. Bernardina, founder of the Order of St. Francis in Syracuse, was a teacher in Utica and founded the hospital to care for its residents. It was originally located in a small house donated by St. Joseph Church.

St. Luke's-Memorial Hospital Center traces its roots to the original St. Luke's Home established in 1869 and the Utica Homeopathic Hospital established in 1895. The Utica Homeopathic Hospital was later renamed Utica Memorial Hospital. In 1949, the two hospitals merged and in 1957, St. Luke's-Memorial Hospital opened at its current location on the St. Luke's Campus on Champlin Avenue in New Hartford.

On July 23, 1992, the Board of Trustees of St. Luke's-Memorial Hospital unanimously approved an affiliation with Faxton Hospital and the two hospitals formed the Mohawk Valley Network. In 1997, Faxton Hospital and St. Luke's-Memorial combined their governing boards into a common 25-member board to serve both hospitals. In 1998, the hospitals formed a single management and in 1999, the hospitals’ foundations combined. On January 1, 2000 the consolidation was completed by the creation of a single entity, Faxton St. Luke's Healthcare. In 2002, the Board of Directors approved the consolidation of programs and services.

In December 2011, the Boards of Directors for Faxton St. Luke's Healthcare and St. Elizabeth Medical Center passed a resolution to begin discussions on the feasibility and benefits of merging or undertaking other transactions that would more closely link the two hospitals. The two organizations had already been collaborative, having founded the Mohawk Valley Heart Institute in 1996 and the Regional Cancer Center in 2000. In December 2012, the organizations signed a memorandum of understanding as the official first step toward affiliation. On March 6, 2014, Faxton St. Luke's Healthcare and St. Elizabeth Medical Center announced their affiliation under the Mohawk Valley Health System. Adirondack Community Physicians and St. Elizabeth Medical Group merged to become MVHS Medical Group.

In 2019, MVHS formally consolidated their two fundraising foundations after informally operating together since 2016. The Faxton St. Luke's Healthcare Foundation and the St. Elizabeth Medical Center Foundation became the Mohawk Valley Health System Foundation.

Health services
MVHS offers many services besides acute hospital care.

In September 2010, Faxton St. Luke's Healthcare was awarded a $31.3 million grant from New York State which was part of a competitive grant opportunity offered by the New York State Department of Health and the Dormitory Authority. The new construction and expansion to the pre-existing St. Luke's Home was designed to improve long-term care services and consolidate community-based alternatives for Oneida County residents. Continuing care services, including Senior Network Health, Visiting Nurse Association of Utica and Oneida County and Mohawk Valley Home Care, were relocated to the Center for Rehabilitation and Continuing Care Services in 2013, along with an expanded Adult Day Health Care Program.

Continuing Care Services

Adult Day Health Care Program – Community-based long-term health care program with recreational and social activities
Mohawk Valley Home Care – Supportive health equipment and services
Senior Network Health – Medicaid managed long-term care program
Visiting Nurse Association of Utica and Oneida County – Certified home health care agency

Dental Health Center
MVHS provides dental care for patients with traditional Medicaid coverage. Home to the Dr. James M. Rozanski General Practice Residency Program, the MVHS Dental Health Center is a teaching facility for dental residents. The residency program was founded in 1980 by Dr. James M. Rozanski. To date, more than 120 dentists have completed the program.

Dialysis Center
MVHS centers are located in Utica, Rome, Oneida, Hamilton and Herkimer.

New hospital

As early as 2014, the same year MVHS was established, the organization began exploring the potential for a new hospital to replace the three existing campuses. A site was ultimately selected in downtown Utica that would displace 38 businesses, prompting community opposition and a lawsuit. The new medical center was designed to be 10 stories and 702,000 sq. ft. More recent plans cite the size as 672,000 sq. ft. Ground was broken in 2019 and construction is scheduled to be complete in 2023. In March 2021 it was announced that the hospital would be named The Wynn Hospital of the Mohawk Valley Health System after Steve Wynn (who was raised in Utica) donated $50 million to the project.

References

Healthcare in New York (state)
Hospital networks in the United States
Medical and health organizations based in New York (state)
Hospitals in New York (state)